The 2019 Barcelona Open Banc Sabadell (also known as the Torneo Godó) was a men's tennis tournament played on outdoor clay courts. It was the 67th edition of the event and part of the ATP Tour 500 series of the 2019 ATP Tour. It took place at the Real Club de Tenis Barcelona in Barcelona, Catalonia, Spain, from April 22 through April 28, 2019.

Points and prize money

Points distribution

Prize money

Singles main-draw entrants

Seeds

1 Rankings as of April 15, 2019.

Other entrants
The following players received wildcards into the main draw:
  Grigor Dimitrov
  David Ferrer
  Nicola Kuhn 
  Feliciano López 
  Alexander Zverev

The following players received entry from the qualifying draw:
  Federico Delbonis
  Hugo Dellien 
  Marcel Granollers
  Albert Ramos Viñolas  
  Diego Schwartzman
  Pedro Sousa

The following players received entry as lucky losers:
  Guido Andreozzi
  Roberto Carballés Baena
  Nicolás Jarry

Withdrawals
  Chung Hyeon → replaced by  Nicolás Jarry
  Alex de Minaur → replaced by  Mischa Zverev
  Fabio Fognini → replaced by  Roberto Carballés Baena
  Philipp Kohlschreiber → replaced by  Guido Andreozzi

Doubles main-draw entrants

Seeds

 Rankings are as of April 15, 2019.

Other entrants
The following pairs received wildcards into the doubles main draw:
  Pablo Carreño Busta /  Feliciano López 
  David Marrero /  Fernando Verdasco

The following pair received entry from the qualifying draw:
  Roberto Carballés Baena /  Jaume Munar

Champions

Singles

  Dominic Thiem def.  Daniil Medvedev, 6–4, 6–0

Doubles

  Juan Sebastián Cabal /  Robert Farah def.  Jamie Murray /  Bruno Soares, 6–4, 7–6(7–4)

References

External links
Official website

Barcelona Open Banc Sabadell
Barcelona Open (tennis)
2019 in Spanish sport
Barcelona Open